Pakpak people are one of the ethnic groups found mainly in North Sumatra, Indonesia. They are scattered in a few regencies and cities in North Sumatra and Aceh, such as Dairi Regency, Pakpak Bharat Regency, Humbang Hasundutan Regency and Central Tapanuli Regency of North Sumatra, and also in Aceh Singkil Regency and Subulussalam, Aceh. Pakpak people have some communities in other cities across Indonesia. The term "Pakpak" also refers to the culture and language of the pakpak people.  

In administrative governance, most of the Pakpak people settled in Dairi Regency, North Sumatra, which later on July 28, 2003 grew into two regencies, namely:-
 Dairi Regency (capital city Sidikalang)
 Pakpak Bharat Regency (capital city Salak)

The Pakpak people are most likely the descendants of the soldiers from Chola Kingdom, India that attacked Srivijaya Kingdom in the 11th century. Pakpak people with surnames of Tendang, Banurea, Manik, Beringin, Gajah, Berasa is believed to be the sons of Mpu Bada or Mpung Bada or Mpubada.

Sub-ethnics

The Pakpak people are divided into five sub-ethnic groups or in local terminology, Pakpak Silima Suak:
 Pakpak Klasen people occupy Parlilitan in Humbang Hasundutan Regency, and Manduamas which is part of Central Tapanuli Regency.
 Pakpak Simsim people dwell in Pakpak Bharat Regency
 Pakpak Boang people settled in Aceh Singkil Regency and Subulussalam, Aceh. The Pakpak Boang people are often mistaken as Singkil people.
 Pakpak Pegagan people settled in Sumbul and its surrounding in Dairi Regency.
 Pakpak Keppas people settled in Sidikalang and its surrounding in Dairi Regency. 
Pakpak people refers their homeland as "Tano Pakpak".

Language 
Pakpak is both a spoken and written language. It is part of Austronesian language and has its own writing system and alphabet. However, nowadays are less and less Pakpak people is using the system.

Pakpak surnames
Pakpak surnames are such as:

 Anakampun
 Angkat
 Bako
 Bancin
 Banurea
 Berampu
 Berasa
 Beringin
 Berutu
 Bintang
 Boangmanalu
 Capah
 Cibro
 Gajah Manik
 Gajah
 Kabeaken
 Kesogihen
 Kaloko
 Kombih
 Kudadiri
 Lingga
 Maha
 Maharaja
 Manik
 Matanari
 Meka
 Maibang
 Padang
 Padang Batanghari
 Pasi
 Penarik Pinayungan
 Ramin
 Sambo
 Saraan
 Sikettang
 Sinamo
 Sitakar
 Solin
 Saing
 Tendang
 Tinambunan
 Tinendung
 Tumangger
 Turutan
 Ujung

Society

The Pakpak people are bound by a social structure, which in local terminology is called sulang silima. Sulang silima consists of five elements that are:-
 Sinina tertua (Perisang-isang, descendants or older generations)
 Sinina penengah (Pertulan tengah, descendants or middle generations)
 Sinina terbungsu (Perekur-ekur, youngest generation)
 Berru (Kinsmen who receive women into their family)
 Puang (Kinsmen who give women into another family)

Five of these elements are very instrumental in decision making in various aspects of life especially in kinship system and traditional ceremonies, be it in the context of a single surname clan based community (Lebbuh) or village based community (Kuta). Therefore, five of these elements must be involved in order for a decision to be considered as valid in customary terms.

Traditional Pakpak ceremonies are named with "working" terms, however the term "festivals" are also frequently used today. Traditional ceremonies are divided into two major parts, namely:-
 Traditional ceremonies that involves joyous occasion are referred to as "good works".
 Traditional ceremonies that involves sorrowful occasion are referred to as "bad works".

Examples of "good works" ceremonies are such as merbayo (wedding ceremony), menanda tahun (paddy planting ceremony), merkottas (initiating a risky task) and so on. While examples of "bad works" ceremonies includes mengrumbang and mate ncayur ntua ceremony (funeral).

References 

Ethnic groups in Sumatra
Ethnic groups in Indonesia
Ethnography
Batak
History of Sumatra
Batak ethnic groups